The broad-striped dasyure (Murexia rothschildi) is a species of marsupial in the family Dasyuridae. It is endemic to Papua New Guinea. Its natural habitat is subtropical or tropical dry forests.

Some authorities place it in the monotypic genus Paramurexia.

References

Dasyuromorphs
Mammals of Papua New Guinea
Mammals described in 1938
Taxonomy articles created by Polbot
Marsupials of New Guinea